Bambusa boniopsis is a species of Bambusa bamboo.

Distribution 
Bambusa boniopsis is endemic to Hainan province of China.

References 

boniopsis
Flora of Hainan